Mah Sonboli (also Romanized as Mah Sonbolī and Mahsonbolī; also known as Māsambūlī) is a village in Howmeh Rural District, in the Central District of Haftkel County, Khuzestan Province, Iran. At the 2006 census, its population was 33, in 9 families.

References 

Populated places in Haftkel County